The Doha class (or Al Zubarah class) is a class of corvettes built by Fincantieri for the Qatari Emiri Navy.

Development 
Fincantieri showcased for the first time the multi-role air defence corvettes for the Qatari Emiri Navy during DIMDEX 2018. In August 2017, Qatar officially announced for the order of the four ships of the class after signing the contract in June 2016.

They are able to operate high speed boats such as rigid-hulled inflatable boat with the help of lateral cranes and hauling ramps. All four of the Doha class will serve as the backbone of the Qatari Emiri Navy.

Potential operators

Greece 
Fincantieri and Elefsis Shipyards are in negotiations with the Greek government. Four Doha-class corvettes to be built in Italy and Greece.

Ships in class

See also 
 Littoral combat ship
 
 
 MILGEM project

References 

Ships built by Fincantieri 
Ships built in Italy
Corvette classes
Doha-class corvettes